Chapan (either from Persian Chapān which means old, threadbare and run-down costume or Chagatai chāpān itself from Persian Jobbe, from Arabic Jubba which means wrapper, cloak, coat, outer garment) is a coat worn over clothes, usually during the cold winter months. Usually worn by men, these coats are adorned with intricate threading and come in a variety of colors and patterns. It is worn in Central Asia, including Uzbekistan, Afghanistan, Pakistan, Tajikistan, Kazakhstan and Kyrgyzstan. A chapan cape was often worn by former Afghan president Hamid Karzai.

See also
 Afghan clothing
 Kaftan
 Żupan

References

Jackets
Afghan clothing
Kazakhstani culture
Kyrgyzstani culture
Tajikistani culture
Uzbekistani culture